Spoon Records is an independent record label managed by Hildegard Schmidt, wife of keyboard player Irmin Schmidt, since 1979, on which music by the krautrock band Can and its members has been released and re-released. It takes its name from the song "Spoon" on Can's Ege Bamyasi album. Hildegard and Irmin Schmidt's daughter Sandra Podmore has been director of Spoon Records since 2008.

See also
 List of record labels

External links
 Spoon Records

German record labels
Can (band)
Vanity record labels
Record labels established in 1974
Experimental music record labels